Carrie Brown (born May 29, 1959) is an American novelist. She is the author of seven novels and a collection of short stories. Her most recent novel, The Stargazer's Sister, was  published by Pantheon Books in January  2016.

Background and education
A Connecticut native, Brown received her Bachelor of Arts from Brown University in 1981 and her Master of Fine Arts from the University of Virginia, where she was a Henry Hoyns Fellow, in 1998. She has taught at The University of North Carolina at Greensboro and currently, she is the Margaret Banister Writer-in-Residence at Sweet Briar College. She lives with her husband, the novelist John Gregory Brown, in Sweet Briar, Virginia.

Work
Brown's first novel, Rose's Garden (Algonquin 1998) won the Barnes & Noble Discover Great New Writers Award. The New York Times Book Review deemed it "A magical first novel...both luminous and wise," 

In a starred review of her second novel, Lamb in Love (Algonquin 1999), Publishers Weekly wrote "Brown eloquently explores  the terrain of human interactions, showing how genuine love can exalt ordinary individuals." The New York Times Book Review called the novel "unconventional and eloquent."

The Hatbox Baby (Algonquin 2000) won the 2001 Library of Virginia Literary Award, the 2001 Great Lakes Independent Booksellers Association Award, and the 2000 Janet Heidinger Kafka Prize.

Her story collection The House on Belle Isle (Algonquin) appeared in 2002. It was a finalist for the 2003 Library of Virginia Literary Award, and the Chicago Tribune called it "Rich in image and insight, gracefully written and peopled with characters who quietly demand our loving attention."

Confinement (Algonquin 2004) won the 2005 Library of Virginia Literary Award  In their review of the book, People Magazine wrote: 
"This beautiful novel maps the emotional life of a World War II refugee who becomes trapped in his new existence in America" and called it "part Sophie's Choice, part Anne Tyler."

Brown's  novel The Rope Walk (Pantheon 2007). It was a finalist for the 2008 Library of Virginia Literary Award  and the 2008 Library of Virginia People's Choice Award. In addition, it was named the 2009 All Iowa Reads Book by the Iowa Public Library. The Washington Post Book World called the novel "gentle, lyrical" and the New Orleans Times Picayune said: "reading this novel is a serious pleasure."

Awards and honors
 The Barnes & Noble Discover New Writers Award 1998
 The Library of Virginia Literary Award: Winner 2001, 2005; Finalist 2003, 2007
 Janet Heidinger Kafka Prize 2000
 Great Lakes Independent Booksellers Association Award 2001
 Library of Virginia People's Choice Award: Finalist 2008
 National Endowment for the Arts Fellowship

References

1959 births
Living people
American women writers
21st-century American women